Movies With Manings was a Canadian movie television series which aired on CBC Television from 1959 to 1960.

Premise
CBC broadcast feature movies prior to Hockey Night in Canada on Saturday evenings. Allan Manings provided introductions to these movies using a set which resembled a living room. Sometimes he was accompanied by guests such as Elwy Yost who later appeared with Manings on CBC's Flashback.

Scheduling
This 90-minute series was broadcast Saturdays at 7:30 p.m. (Eastern) from 3 October 1959 to 16 April 1960.

See also
 Great Movies

References

External links
 

CBC Television original programming
1959 Canadian television series debuts
1960 Canadian television series endings
Black-and-white Canadian television shows
Canadian motion picture television series